Shvaikivtsi is a village in Chortkiv Raion, Ternopil Oblast of Ukraine. It belongs to Zavodske settlement hromada, one of the hromadas of Ukraine. It is the administrative center of the former Shmankivchyky village council.

Geography 

Toponymy 
Mykola Krykun gives the following variants of the names of the village. Schweik, recorded in chronological order in the relevant sources:
 Szwajkowce, s. – Lifting register 1629, 1650, 1667;
 Szwajkowce, s. – Kamenets Zemstvo Book 1636;
 Szwajkowce, s. – Commissioner's Register 1678;
 Sewoykofce, s. – Boplan.

History

Ancient times 
A mound and a settlement of Kievan Rus' were found near the village.

Middle Ages, modern era 
The first written mention of the settlement was in 1485 as the property of the Buczacki brothers with the Abdank coat of arms.

In 1485, the sons of David Buczacki, Michal, Stanislav and Jan, acquired the villages of Shvaikivtsi and Sekmanivtsi in Podilia from the Fredro family.

According to the Podolsk Voivodeship tax register, compiled by the royal captain and customs officer of Podolsk Stanisław Jacimirski in 1569, the village belonged to the heir Golinski and had three plowmen, each of whom had to pay 10 groschen from the plow.

The tax register of the Kamyanets eyalet for 1681 describes the state of the village: "The village of Shvaykivtsi is abandoned, not far from Chortkiv. One watermill was destroyed, one was destroyed. By estimating the cost of 5000".

In 1785 the village had 306 inhabitants. During the Austro-Hungarian Empire, there were two inns (owned by Jews) and two shops in Shvaikivtsi. In 1880 there were 96 houses and 633 people in the village. Several locals emigrated to Canada. In the village there was a folwark (owned by the deceased German Rudorf), a mill.

20th century 
For some time Shvaikivtsi was the center of the commune of the same name. From August 1, 1934, to 1939, the village belonged to the Kolindiana commune.

On July 20–21, 1941, the NKVD shot the villagers Dmytro Ivantsiv and Anton Yavorsky in the town of Uman in the Cherkasy Region.

From June 1941 to March 1944 the village was under Nazi occupation.

Period of Independence 
In March 2009, a cross appeared on a poplar tree between Shvaykivtsi and Hadynkivtsi.

Since November 27, 2020, Shvaikivtsi has belonged to the Zavodske settlement hromada.

Education 
For some time there was an unorganized school in the village (in particular, in 1880), where Edward Paklerski worked as a teacher.

In Austria-Hungary, there was a one-grade school with Ukrainian as the language of instruction; during the Polish Empire, there was a two-grade utraquist (bilingual) school.

The school building is well-preserved and children studied there until 2004.

Religion 
 Exaltation of the Holy Cross Church (UGCC; 1734; wooden, restored in the 1990s).

In the village there is a chapel of All Saints of the Ukrainian people in honor of the arrival in Ukraine of Pope John Paul II (built in 2004).

Sights 
 Shvaykivtsi Mound I (Western Podolia group of Scythian times) is a newly discovered object of cultural heritage, protection number 1479.
 The settlement of Shvaykivtsi II (Bronze Age; Early Iron Age; Trypillia culture; Chernyakhiv culture) is a newly discovered object of cultural heritage, protection number 1850.
 a monument to fellow villagers killed in the German-Soviet war (1985).
 monument to the religious figure V. Bayrak (2004, sculptor D. Pylypyak)
 sculpture of St. Florian (1864; founder Rudroff)

Social sphere, economy 
The village had a chapter of the Prosvita society since 1906, as well as a Sich, agricultural association, library, choir and theater groups, and cooperatives.

Until 2021, there was a club and a library, which were reorganized into a studio with Shmankivtsi Center for Cultural Services of the Zavodske settlement hromada.

There is a first-aid post, Zlagoda PAP, and Andriy, Sokil-2, and Kurgan-2 farms.

Famous people 
  (monastic name Vitaly; 1907–1946) – religious figure, Basilian hieromonk.

In literature 
In 2022, Lyudmila Humeniuk published the book Shvaykivtsi in the course of centuries.

See also 
 Stavky (river)

References

Sources 
 Антохів М., Уніят В. Швайківці // Тернопільський енциклопедичний словник : у 4 т. / редкол.: Г. Яворський та ін. — Тернопіль : Видавничо-поліграфічний комбінат «Збруч», 2008. — Т. 3 : П — Я. — С. 628. — ISBN 978-966-528-279-2.
 Мельничук Б., Уніят В., Федечко М. Швайківці // Тернопільщина. Історія міст і сіл : у 3 т. — Тернопіль : ТзОВ «Терно-граф», 2014. — T. 3 : М — Ш. — С. 519—520. — ISBN 978-966-457-246-7.
 Boniecki A. Herbarz polski: wiadomości historyczno-genealogiczne o rodach szlacheckich. — Warszawa : Warszawskie Towarzystwo Akcyjne S. Orgelbranda S[yn]ów), 1909. — Cz. 1. — T. 13. — S. 331—349. (пол.)
 Швайківці. Чортківська округа. Історично-мемуарний збірник / ред. колегія О. Соневицької та інші. — Париж — Сидней — Торонто : НТШ, Український архів, 1974. — Т. XXVII. — С. 229—230.

Geography of Ternopil Oblast